Gabriel Lázaro de Mangubat, also known as Capitán Loreto Mangubat, was a gobernadorcillo, a Spanish and Filipino nobleman and governor, from the 17th century.

In 1628 Lázaro the Mangubat established the first organized settlement in Bantayan in the aftermath of Muslim raid on that year.

He also built a presidio in the northernmost part of Bantayan Island where Madridejos formerly Lawis also spelled Lauis or Louis -meaning " Point to the sea"
is now located to protect the inhabitants.

Construction of the fort (presidio) began in 1628 and lasted around 1635.

He regrouped and organized the survivors and formed a government then known as "the Lawis government".

He was proclaimed (by the Spanish Superior Government) as the "founder of Lawis", and founder of all the other settlements that came into existence later on the Island including the settlements of Suba and Binaobao in central Bantayan Island that later combined to form what is now called the Municipality of Bantayan (formally became a pueblo in 1763), and the settlement of Octong formally became a pueblo in 1872 known as Pueblo de Octon or Gogtong today municipality of Santa Fe (Holy Faith).

Lázaro also built a stone church (the third in Bantayan Island) whose ruined walls and post can still be seen in the northernmost part of the town in 1960s.

It was also him who proclaimed the place a "VISITA" (this marks the beginnings of a new parish (founded and built in 1800s) in the Municipality of Bantayan.

though in year 1580 there's already a Parochial Church and convent established on Bantayan Island but it ceased to exist.

the church, convent and villages were destroyed, people were killed and only few have survived during the Muslim raid in year 1600.

the Northern part of Cebu Island (Daan Bantayan) and Northerpart of Bantayan Island (Lawis) was originally used as a guarding post or look out Station in year 1574 to monitor the Visayan Sea against Chinese threats led by Limahong who invaded Manila, the location gives a timely warning and preparation for the Spanish City of Cebu located in Fort San Pedro in case of Chinese invasions originating from Luzon. thus the island got its name "Bantayan" a Filipino term that means "to guard"

In 1635 Lazaro moved to Mindanao and established a Kota (camp) and a Fuerte (fort) in the Southern part of Mindanao now known as Zamboanga del Sur facing the Island of Basilan, Jolo, and Borneo. It was Fray Melchor de Vera, was appointed designer of the fort.

The people of Madridejos honoured its founder by naming one of the streets Lazaro Mangubat Street. Lazaro was from Opon before settling in Madridejos, hence, in reverence to his roots, a street in Poblacion (Opon) Lapu-Lapu City, the G (ABRIEL) MANGUBAT Street was named after his memory.

Time line

1574

Bantayan Island was used as Observation Post and Choke point after Daan Bantayan by the Spanish Army to monitor and to safeguard Cebu City leading the place to be known as Bantayan (to Guard)

1574–1580

The church in Bantayan was constructed by the Augustinians

1588

The church built in Bantayan by the Augustinians was abandoned

1600

First moro raid took place
destroyed the first stone church (laid down 1574 – consecrated 1580)

1615

Fray Garcia Jacome
Served as Spiritual counsellor for the people of bantayan, candaya

1627 
Francisco Rodriguez Relator
March 2, 1627 Cura Bantayan

1627 
Juan Nuñez Crespo
March 3, 1627 cura Bantayan

1628 
Moro raid took place, destroying the Church (Chapel) standing from 1600–1628 that was made of Wood and Nipa

1628 
Spanish Army landed on Bantayan Island led by Lazaro Mangubat 
New stone church was built the third in Bantayan and the second church that was made of stone ;
A Military Fort was also built (1628–1635)

1635 
the Spanish Military abandoned the fort they built in Northern tip of Bantayan Island, handed the church to the religious, 
and moved to Mindanao and then to Mindanao Island’s southern region (now Zamboanga) where they established a military settlement and built a fort now known as the Fort Pilar

1635 
Carlos de Figueroa
December 4, 1635 Bantayan Island

1639 
Juan Roa
September 26, 1639 cura intero Bantayan

1646 
Francisco de Acosta
January 13, 1646 Cura Bantayan

1763 
The Municipality of Bantayan was created and called "Pueblo de Bantayan" bearing the Island’s name and the name of the defunct settlement established in 1574 in the northern region of Bantayan Island. 
(Binaobao, Suba and other adjacent settlements combined to form the Pueblo) and it became the CABECERA (center) politically and ecclesiastically of Bantayan Island as it surpassed LAWIS an old settlement (founded in 1628) economically and by means of numbers of settlers and population growth

1872 
Pueblo (town) of OCTONG now (municipality of Santa Fe) was created.

References

Visayan people
People from Cebu
Filipino Roman Catholics
People of Spanish colonial Philippines
Filipino datus, rajas and sultans
Filipino nobility
17th-century Filipino people